Dos Indios River or Rio dos Indios may refer to:

Rivers in Brazil
 Dos Indios River (lower Ivaí River tributary), Paraná
 Dos Indios River (upper Ivaí River tributary), Paraná
 Dos Indios River (Canoas River tributary), Santa Catarina
 Dos Indios River (Itajaí River tributary), Santa Catarina

Other uses
 Rio dos Índios, a municipality in Rio Grande do Sul, Brazil